Madison County is a county in the U.S. state of Illinois. It is a part of the Metro East in southern Illinois. According to the 2020 census, it had a population of 264,776, making it the eighth-most populous county in Illinois and the most populous in the southern portion of the state. The county seat is Edwardsville, and the largest city is Granite City.

Madison County is part of the Metro-East region of the St. Louis, MO-IL Metropolitan Statistical Area. The pre-Columbian city of Cahokia Mounds, a World Heritage Site, was located near Collinsville. Edwardsville is home to Southern Illinois University Edwardsville. To the north, Alton is known for its abolitionist and American Civil War-era history. It is also the home of the Southern Illinois University School of Dental Medicine. Godfrey, the village named for Captain Benjamin Godfrey, offers Lewis and Clark Community College formerly the Monticello Female Seminary.

History
Madison County was established on September 14, 1812. It was formed from parts of Randolph and St. Clair counties and named for President James Madison. At the time of its formation, Madison County included all of the modern State of Illinois north of St. Louis, as well as all of Wisconsin, part of Minnesota, and Michigan's Upper Peninsula.

In the late 19th century, Madison County became an industrial region, and in the 20th century was known first for Graniteware, and later for its steel mills, oil refineries, and other heavy industries. The county had a large working population, and the county and surrounding area was a center of strength for the Democratic Party.

Industrial restructuring cost many jobs and reduced the population.  The county now is part of the eastern St. Louis metropolitan area (nicknamed "Metro East"), as is neighboring St. Clair County.

In 2009, the EPA issued an air pollution report that ranked Madison County as the county with the second-highest cancer risk in the country due to air pollution, second only to Los Angeles County, California.

Geography
Madison County is on the Mississippi River, while the other major body of water is Horseshoe Lake.

Climate and weather

Climate Zone 4A per the International Energy Conservation Code.

Adjacent counties and city

 Bond County - east
 Clinton County - southeast
 Jersey County - northwest
 Macoupin County - north
 Montgomery County - northeast
 St. Charles County, Missouri - northwest
 St. Clair County - south
 St. Louis, Missouri - west
 St. Louis County, Missouri - west

Parks and Reserves

 Chouteau Island
 Gabaret Island
 Horseshoe Lake State Park
 Mosenthein Island

Transportation

Major highways

  I-55
  I-70
  I-255
  I-270
  US 40
  US 67
  IL 3
  IL 4
  IL 100
                                                                                  IL 162
  IL 140
 
  IL 160
  IL 143
  IL 157
  IL 159
  IL 111
  IL 203
  IL 255
  IL 267

Demographics 

According to the 2020 census, the racial makeup of the county was 81.4% white (80.4% white non-hispanic), 9.4% black or African American, 1.0% Asian, 0.3% American Indian, 6.3% two or more races, and 1.5% some other race. Those of Hispanic or Latino origin made up 4.1% of the population.

According to the 2010 census, there were 269,282 people, 108,094 households, and 71,756 families residing in the county. The racial makeup of the county was 88.2% white, 7.9% black or African American, 0.8% Asian, 0.2% American Indian, 0.9% from other races, and 1.8% from two or more races. Those of Hispanic or Latino origin made up 2.7% of the population. In terms of ancestry, 32.7% were German, 14.9% were Irish, 10.5% were English, 7.5% were American, and 5.7% were Italian.

Of the 108,094 households, 31.4% had children under the age of 18 living with them, 49.3% were married couples living together, 12.2% had a female householder with no husband present, 33.6% were non-families, and 26.8% of all households were made up of individuals. The average household size was 2.46 and the average family size was 2.98. The median age was 38.6 years.

The median income for a household in the county was $51,941 and the median income for a family was $64,630. Males had a median income of $50,355 versus $35,543 for females. The per capita income for the county was $26,127. About 9.1% of families and 12.9% of the population were below the poverty line, including 19.3% of those under age 18 and 6.6% of those age 65 or over.

Communities

Cities

 Alton
 Collinsville (partly in St. Clair County)
 Edwardsville
 Fairmont City
 Granite City
 Highland
 Madison
 Troy
 Venice

Villages

 Alhambra
 Bethalto
 East Alton
 Glen Carbon
 Godfrey
 Grantfork
 Hamel
 Hartford
 Livingston
 Marine
 Maryville
 New Douglas
 Pontoon Beach
 Pierron
 Roxana
 South Roxana
 St. Jacob
 Williamson
 Wood River
 Worden

Census Designated Places
 Holiday Shores
 Mitchell
 Rosewood Heights

Other unincorporated and historic communities

 Binney
 Cottage Hills
 Donkville
 Dorsey
 Fosterburg
 Gard
 Goshen Settlement
 Kaufman
 Kuhn Station
 LeClaire
 Lincoln Place
 Lumaghi Heights
 Meadowbrook
 Midway
 Moro
 Newport
 Poag
 Prairietown
 St. Morgan
 State Park Place
 Upper Alton
 Wanda

Townships
Madison County is divided into twenty-four townships:

 Alhambra
 Alton
 Chouteau
 Collinsville
 Edwardsville
 Fort Russell
 Foster
 Godfrey
 Granite City
 Hamel
 Helvetia
 Jarvis
 Leef
 Marine
 Moro
 Nameoki
 New Douglas
 Olive
 Omphghent
 Pin Oak
 Saline
 St. Jacob
 Venice
 Wood River

Islands

 Chouteau Island
 Gabaret Island
 Mosenthein Island

Historic Settlements

 Camp Dubois

Population ranking
The population ranking of the following table is based on the 2020 census of Madison County.

† county seat

Politics
Like much of southern Illinois, Madison County was a predominantly Democratic area for much of its history, but in recent elections has been moving towards the Republicans. Mitt Romney narrowly carried the county in the 2012 presidential election, becoming the first Republican presidential nominee to do so since 1984. In 2016, Donald Trump carried the largest share of the vote for any Republican presidential candidate since 1972. The county also supported the Republican candidates for governor in 2010, 2014, 2018, and 2022.

See also
 National Register of Historic Places listings in Madison County, Illinois
 The Invincible Thieves

References

External links
 Madison County website
 A History of Madison County Illinois
 Madison Historical: The Online Encyclopedia and Digital Archive for Madison County, Illinois

 
Illinois counties
1812 establishments in Illinois Territory
Illinois counties on the Mississippi River
Metro East
Populated places established in 1812
Pre-statehood history of Illinois